Deh-e Kadkhoda Ali-ye Namruri (also Romanized as Deh-e Kadkhodā ‘Alī-ye Namrūrī; also known as Deh-e Kadkhodā ‘Alī-ye Namrūdī) is a village in Margan Rural District, in the Central District of Hirmand County, Sistan and Baluchestan Province, Iran. At the 2006 census, its population was 327, in 75 families.

References 

Populated places in Hirmand County